The 2020–21 South African Premier Division season (known as the DSTV Premiership for sponsorship reasons) was the 25th season of the Premier Soccer League since its establishment in 1996. Mamelodi Sundowns were the three-time defending champions. This season's winner will qualify for the 2021–22 CAF Champions League along with the second placed team. The 3rd placed team and Nedbank Cup winners qualify for the 2021–22 CAF Confederation Cup.

Team changes

The following teams have changed division since the 2019–20 season.

To National First Division
Relegated from 2019–20 South African Premier Division
 Polokwane City

From National First Division
Promoted to 2020–21 South African Premier Division
 Moroka Swallows (promoted as champions)

Purchased status
 Tshakhuma Tsha Madzivhandila (TTM) (purchased the Bidvest Wits status)
 TS Galaxy (purchased the Highland Park status)

Sold their status
 Bidvest Wits (sold their Premier League status to Tshakhuma Tsha Madzivhandila)
 Highland Park  (sold their Premier League status to TS Galaxy)

Teams

Stadiums and locations

Number of teams by province

League table

Results

Statistics

Top scorers

Hat-tricks

Most assists

Clean sheets

References

See also
2020 MTN 8
2020 Telkom Knockout
2020–21 Nedbank Cup
2020–21 National First Division

External links 
 Official website

South Africa
Premier Division
Premier Soccer League seasons